Mattea Roach (born October 26, 1998) is a Canadian tutor and game show contestant who held a 23-game winning streak on the game show Jeopardy! from April 5, 2022, to May 6, 2022. Roach was the most successful Canadian to play Jeopardy! and is placed in sixth for all-time regular season wins. She won US$560,983 throughout her run, getting the correct response to 93 percent of buzzed-in clues. With her streak, Roach qualified for her season's Tournament of Champions.

Early and personal life 
Roach graduated from Sacred Heart School of Halifax and has family residing in Halifax and Cape Breton. She was raised for the first six years of her life and part of her adolescence in Halifax. She maintains some traditions from Sacred Heart's Catholic curriculum and frequently prayed the Hail Mary during her Jeopardy! introductions. She graduated from the University of Toronto with a bachelor's degree in sexual diversity studies, political science, and women and gender studies. At the time of her run, she worked as a Law School Admission Test (LSAT) tutor and lived in Toronto.

Roach identifies as lesbian. She has said that her favourite game show growing up was Wheel of Fortune but that she also grew up watching Jeopardy! She has tattoos of Talking Heads quotes and has met Bill Gates. In a May 2022 interview published in Vulture, Roach said that she would prefer Ken Jennings, who hosted the majority of her Jeopardy! episodes, to become the show's permanent host.

In her May 4, 2022, episode, she spoke of having participated in Choir! Choir! Choir!'s 2018 show performing Rick Astley's 1987 hit "Never Gonna Give You Up" with Astley himself in attendance.

Jeopardy! 
Throughout her run, Roach won 23 games and US$560,983, equivalent to over 750,000 Canadian dollars. At the time of the end of her run on May 6, 2022, she was fifth in total all-time regular season earnings and fifth in total regular-season wins. She is ranked sixth in total all-time regular season earnings, fifth in total regular-season wins, and tenth in all-time winnings (including tournaments) . At 23 years of age at the time of her winning streak, she is the youngest contestant to have won as much as she has. After winning her first game and $32,001, Roach proclaimed "My student loan is paid off." 

Roach has said that when she arrived for her first game, she had expected to face off with Amy Schneider, whose 40-day streak had ended, unbeknownst to most, a few months before Roach started competing. The season in which she competed also included 10-plus-game winning streaks from Schneider, Matt Amodio, and Jonathan Fisher.

As the most successful Canadian, Roach lamented that the late former host and Canadian Alex Trebek was not still hosting the game. Of her game strategy, Roach has talked about focusing on the things that are controllable. She also called her strategy "bad", saying it was about minimizing loss versus gain maximization.

Roach was the only person on stage for Final Jeopardy! for her 12th game on April 20, 2022, the first time that scenario had occurred since October 13, 2020. Later, in her 17th appearance on April 27, 2022, Roach had exactly double the score of the second place opponent, Ben Hsia, at the start of Final Jeopardy! Hsia bet all his earnings and responded to the clue correctly, tying him with Roach. Roach also responded correctly, betting only $1, winning the game by $1.

Roach lost her 24th game on May 6, 2022, bringing a close to her winning streak after she failed to provide the correct response in Final Jeopardy! The contestant who dethroned Roach was Danielle Maurer, a digital marketing manager from Peachtree Corners, Georgia, who finished with a winning total of $15,600, beating Roach by $1.

Roach appeared in the Jeopardy! Tournament of Champions that aired in November 2022 but lost to Andrew He.

Post-Jeopardy!
In September 2022, Roach was named as the new host of The Backbench, a biweekly political interview podcast from the Canadaland network of political and media analysis podcasts.

In 2023, she is slated to participate as one of the panelists in Canada Reads, championing Kate Beaton's graphic novel Ducks: Two Years in the Oil Sands.

See also 
 List of notable Jeopardy! contestants
 Strategies and skills of Jeopardy! champions

Notes

References

External links

1998 births
Jeopardy! contestants
Canadian lesbians
Living people
People from Halifax, Nova Scotia
People from Toronto
21st-century Canadian LGBT people
University of Toronto alumni
Canadian podcasters